Harlal Singh was a campaigner in the farmers' movement of colonial India, described by Richard Sisson as "the single most important Jat leader in Shekhawati." Recruited to politics by the Jat Mahasabha, he remained a member of that organisation from 1925 to 1929, at which time many people left it. There were growing concerns that the Mahasabha, which had been created by the British Raj administration, was being used by the Raj as a means of pacifying the Jat people by at once affirming their community's position in society but also preventing change. Later, in the 1940s, Singh served as president of an urban-based political protest movement, called the Praja Mandal, and was an important conduit between the urban and agrarian communities in their efforts seeking independence of India. Post-independence, and with the Praja Mandals now a part of the Indian National Congress, he was appointed by the Rajasthan Pradesh Congress Committee as their organiser in the former princely state of Jaipur.

References 
Citations

Bibliography

Further reading 

Rajasthani people
Date of birth unknown
Date of death unknown